Portsmouth Lifeboat Station is located on Eastney Point near Southsea, in the English county of Hampshire. The station is owned and operated by the RNLI and is an Inshore lifeboat station. The station is facing Langstone Harbour on one of the tributaries flowing into the Solent. The station was established in May 1965.

History 
The first lifeboat station in Portsea opened in 1886 and was known as Southsea Lifeboat station and was operated by the RNLI. This station had been opened as it had been realised by the RNLI committees of the neighbouring stations of Hayling island and Bembridge that the Solent’s busy shipping lanes required additional cover upstream towards the cities of Portsmouth and Southampton. The first lifeboat was called Heyland and she was a 10 oared self-righting pulling lifeboat. She was the first of three lifeboats to serve at Southsea.

The Southsea station was closed in 1918 when the RNLI decided that the area would be adequately covered by the stations at Hayling and Bembridge. Increases in traffic and the introduction of inflatable boats that required smaller crews led to the re-establishment of the station in May 1965. A boathouse was constructed at Eastney Point facing Langstone Harbour. The first inshore lifeboat was paid for by funds raised by Hemel Hempstead Round Table. This was a D-class ILB and had the Number 48. By 1967 the station was operating two rigid hull inshore lifeboats with the craft being kept at permanent anchor in the harbour at Eastney.

In 1975 the station was provided with a new boat house to keep the stations newly allocated Atlantic and D-class lifeboats. The previous ILB which had been moored afloat were withdrawn from the service. This boat house was re-developed in 1991 which provided the staff and crews with a changing/drying room, new toilet and shower facilities and a first aid reception room. Also within the building there is a workshop, training and briefing room and a station office.

Station lifeboats 
The two current lifeboats on station are an Atlantic 85 B-class lifeboat and a D-class inflatable inshore lifeboat. The Atlantic 85 is called Norma T (B-846) which has been on the station since 23 October 2010 and was funded by a donation from Bob and Norma Thomas. The D-class lifeboat is called Brian’s Pride(D-716) which has been on station since 6 August 2009 and this lifeboat was funded with a donation from Brian Bass.

All weather boats

Inshore lifeboats

A-class lifeboat

B-class lifeboats

D-class lifeboats

Neighbouring station locations

References 

Lifeboat stations in Hampshire